Moorebank is a suburb of Sydney, in the state of New South Wales, Australia. Moorebank is located 27 kilometres south-west of the Sydney central business district in the local government area of the City of Liverpool.

Moorebank features a mix of residential and industrial areas. Moorebank Shopping Village is a small shopping centre.

History
The suburb takes its name from early settler Thomas Moore. Moorebank was originally home to vineyards and other rural activities. Nuwarra Public School opened in 1973 and is located directly opposite Moorebank shopping centre, which also opened in the early 1970s. Moorebank is built atop a plateau and was cut off from surrounding areas in the floods of 1986.

Transport
The M5 Motorway links Moorebank east to the Sydney central business district and west to Campbelltown. Moorebank is close to Liverpool railway station on the Inner West & Leppington Line, Bankstown Line and Cumberland Line of the Sydney Trains network.

Moorebank is the site of the proposed Moorebank Intermodal Terminal.

Schools
 Nuwarra Public School
Note: Moorebank High School, Newbridge Heights Public School and St Josephs Primary are now in the adjacent suburb of Chipping Norton, due to a suburb border change.

Churches
Moorebank has several churches for the suburb
 St Thomas (Anglican)
 St Joseph (Catholic)
 Freedom City Church

Sport and recreation
Moorebank is home to a number of local sporting teams, most of which use Hammondville Park as their home ground. Most prominent is the Moorebank Magpies Australian Football team which plays in the second division of the Sydney AFL competition. The Moorebank Rams rugby league team plays in the Canterbury-Bankstown Junior Rugby League competition but have previously fielded teams in the Metropolitan Cup, the most senior Sydney competition beneath the National Rugby League. Moorebank also fields a soccer team in the Southern Districts Soccer Football Association, a cricket team in the Fairfield-Liverpool Cricket Association, a baseball team (the Royals) in the Bankstown District Baseball Association and also has netball and fishing clubs. Moorebank/Liverpool District Hockey Club operates out of Ernie Smith Reserve with 3 international standard water based turfs and is one of the most successful clubs in Sydney.

Moorebank is also home to a purpose-built remote control car race track. The John Grant International Raceway is located in Helles Reserve which is just off Helles Avenue, near the Moorebank Road and M5 intersection. The racetrack is run by the New South Wales Remote Control Race Car Club Incorporated, a not-for-profit club, and was host to the 2001 IFMAR World Championships for 8th scale racing which saw the world's best 8th scale racers attend this event.

Also situated in Helles Reserve, on the Georges River, is the NSW Barefoot Waterski Club. The site is considered one of the best in the World with consistent pristine water conditions. NSWBWSC has hosted many World Championships, National Championships, State Titles and Club Tournaments. Growth and development of first time barefooters and nurturing of junior members is key to the club's goal and purpose.

Moorebank has a small lake called Clinches Pond. It is surrounded by a park called Chinches Pond Reserve.

Population

Demographics
According to the 2016 census undertaken by the Australian Bureau of Statistics, Moorebank was home to 9,747 people. 63.8% of people were born in Australia. The next most common countries of birth were Vietnam 2.9%, India 2.3%, Fiji 2.1%, Lebanon 1.8% and Philippines 1.8%. 56.9% of people spoke only English at home. Other languages spoken at home included Arabic 6.6%, Greek 5.0%, Vietnamese 4.2%, Hindi 2.3% and Mandarin 2.1%. The most common responses for religion in Moorebank were Catholic 30.7%, No Religion 14.3%, Anglican 12.2%, Eastern Orthodox 9.2% and Islam 6.5%.

The average age was 35 compared to 38 for the country as a whole and the median household income was $1,889 per week compared to a national figure of $1,438. Much of this, however, was gobbled up by housing loan repayments where the median figure for Moorebank ($2,419 per month) was well above the national figure of $1,755.

Notable residents
 Robert Kaleski (1877–1961), bushman and dog expert.
 Harley Matthews (1889–1968), vigneron, soldier and author of four books about his experiences at Gallipoli.
 Thomas Moore (1762–1840), explorer and first British settler of Moorebank.
 Robert Braiden (1971), film writer and director.

References

Suburbs of Sydney
City of Liverpool (New South Wales)